Ab Baran-e Yek (also Romanized as Āb Bārān-e Yek; also known as Āb Bārān and Āb-e-Bārān) is a village in Ab Baran Rural District, Joulaki District, Aghajari County, Khuzestan Province, Iran. At the 2011 census, its population was 78 in 18 families.

References 

Populated places in Aghajari County